The 2009 Copa Sudamericana de Clubes (officially the 2009 Copa Nissan Sudamericana de Clubes for sponsorship reasons) is the 8th edition of the CONMEBOL's secondary international club tournament. Internacional were the defending champions, having won the trophy the previous season. Ecuadorian side LDU Quito won the 2009 tournament, becoming the first Ecuadorian winners of the trophy.

From this edition onward, CONCACAF teams, which have participated in the tournament since 2005, will no longer be participating because of the format change in the CONCACAF Champions League, which conflicted with scheduling. This will also mark the last tournament in which Argentine clubs River Plate and Boca Juniors will be invited to participate without qualification. Further changes include the additional allocation of berths (1) to all the countries except Brazil and Argentina.

Qualified teams

First stage 

The first stage began on August 4, and ended on September 17. Team #1 played the first leg at home. All teams, except for defending champion Internacional, entered the tournament in the First Stage.

|}

Final stages

Round of 16 

The first leg of the round of 16 was played from September 22 to September 24. The second leg was played from September 30 to October 1. Team #1 played the first leg at home.

|}

Quarterfinals 

The first leg of the Quarterfinals was played from October 20–22. The second leg was played from November 4–5. Team #1 played the first leg at home.

|}

Semifinals 

The first leg was played from November 11–12. The second leg was played from November 18–19. Team #1 played the first leg at home.

|}

Finals 

The Finals were played on November 25 and December 2. Just like the 2008 Copa Libertadores Finals, both teams played against each other in a final.

Top goalscorers

References

External links 
 CONMEBOL's official website 
 Official rules 
 Universofutbol.com - Copa Sudamericana 2009 

 
2
2009